Aethiophysa dichordalis is a moth in the family Crambidae. It was described by George Hampson in 1912. It is found in Suriname.

References

Glaphyriinae
Moths described in 1912
Moths of South America